The Belvedere Estate consists of Belvedere House and the  grounds surrounding it, in which the National Library of India is housed, since 1948. It is located in Alipore, near the zoo, in Kolkata. Belvedere House was the former palace for the Viceroy of India and later the Governor of Bengal.

The Governor-General resided in Belvedere House, Kolkata until the early nineteenth century, when Government House (present Raj Bhavan) was constructed. In 1854, after the Governor-General moved out, the Lieutenant-Governor of Bengal took up residence in Belvedere House. When the capital moved from Kolkata to Delhi in 1912, the Lieutenant-Governor of Bengal, who had hitherto resided in Belvedere House, was upgraded to a full governor and transferred to Government House.

History
It is believed that the roots of Belvedere House lie in the late 1760s from approximately the time when Mir Jafar Ali Khan, the Nawab of the province of Bengal was compelled by the British East India Company to abdicate his throne at Murshidabad to Qasim Khan in 1760. Mir Jafar moved to Kolkata where he is thought to have owned a large court house, and settled within the safety of English East India Company fortifications at Alipore. It is believed that while he was in Kolkata, he built many buildings in the area and gifted Belvedere House to Warren Hastings.

After the Battle of Buxar in 1764 Hastings left for England. Two governors, Verelst and Cartier occupied the Belvedere during the period when Hastings was away in England. Hastings returned to Kolkata as governor in 1772 and to his garden house, the Belvedere with a certain Baroness Inhoff by his side.

The grounds of Belvedere Estate were witness to a duel between Warren Hastings and his legal officer, Philip Francis. The duel may have been over the Baroness Inhoff who was staying with Hastings in Belvedere House, although an Australian historian, Arthur Staples, is inclined to conclude that the duel was the outcome of political conflict between the two.

There is not much clarity around this period of the history of Belvedere Estate and it is believed that Hastings finally sold Belvedere House to a Major Tolly in the 1780s for the sum of Rs. 60,000. Major Tolly died in 1784 and his family sold the property in 1802. From 1854 to 1911 the Belvedere housed a number of lieutenant governors, starting with Halliday, until the British India capital moved to Delhi.

Charles Robert Prinsep (1790–1864), a Cambridge graduate and Lincoln's Inn barrister from a family with long associations to India, lived at Belvedere Estate for a time. (He later named family property in Australia 'Belvedere' after the estate.) Prinsep served as standing counsel to the East India Company and then as the Judge Advocate General of India during the time when he resided at Belvedere. He was the brother of Henry Thoby Prinsep, a civil servant in India.

After this it was turned into the official residence of the Viceroy of India.

The complex now includes within it, two housing colonies built by the government, one being for National Library of India employees, and the other for central government employees. The main building is under the care of the Archaeological Survey of India. Presently the major portion of the Belvedere Estate houses National Library of India. While a small portion of Belvedere Estate is being used as residential complex for fairly senior Central Government employees and is known as '1, Belvedere Estate, Alipore Road', consists of 24 Type VI houses and 77 Type V houses, is under the control and maintenance by the CPWD ( Central Public Works Department) and provides very quiet and pollution free housing, with plenty of old trees and walking area, to the Central Government Employees.

See also
Government Houses of India
Government Houses of the British Empire

References

External links
National Library of India, Official website

Houses completed in the 18th century
Buildings and structures in Kolkata
Official residences in India
British Empire